State Road 158 is a short connector route in Lawrence County in the southwest portion of the U.S. State of Indiana.

Route description
State Road 158 begins at the Martin County line, at the east edge of the Crane Naval Surface Warfare Center (which is west of Bedford).  The road winds to the east through the small towns of Fayetteville and Eureka.  It terminates at State Road 450 on the west edge of Bedford, near U.S. Route 50.  It covers a distance of about 10 miles.

Major intersections

References

External links

158
Transportation in Lawrence County, Indiana